Betzigauis a municipality in the district of Oberallgäu in Bavaria in Germany. The altitude of the village ranges from 709 m above sea level to 946 m. Betzigau is on the Buchloe–Lindau railway line.

Population Development 
From 1988 to 2008 Betzigau grew by 440 residents, or 19 %. Between 1988 and 2018 the village grew from 2320 to 2926 so 606 residents, or 26,1 %.

The following figures refer to the territorial status of May 25, 1987.

Politic 

Roland Helfrich is the mayor of Betzigau.

The municipal tax revenue in 2017 was €2,841,000. Of that, €606,000 were revenue from trade tax.

Ground Monuments

References

Oberallgäu